Terence Lionel Paine  (born 23 March 1939) is an English retired footballer. Originally from Winchester, Paine is best known for his career with Southampton, for whom he made over 800 appearances (a club record) in 18 seasons with the club. He later played for Hereford United, and briefly worked at Cheltenham Town as a player-manager. He played primarily as a winger, but was also comfortable in other midfield positions and as a forward.

Paine began his career as a youth player with local club Winchester City, before signing professional terms with Southampton in 1956. He quickly became a regular for the team as a right-sided winger, and was also on occasion played on the left wing, in the centre of midfield, or up front. In 1960 he was a part of the squad which won the club's only Third Division title, and in 1966 helped the club to its first promotion to the First Division. Paine left Southampton in 1974, after the club was relegated back to the Second Division.

For the last three years of his playing career Paine played for Hereford United, helping the club win its first Third Division title in 1976 and thus achieve promotion to the Second Division. He retired at the end of the 1976–77 season, and held a number of coaching roles before taking on the job of first team manager at Cheltenham Town in 1980, where he also played the occasional match. He left after just half a season, and has since held a number of coaching roles at various clubs and worked as a sports pundit in South Africa.

Club career

Winchester City
Paine worked as a coach-builder at Eastleigh's British Railways depot, and played his early football for his local club, Winchester City and featured in their Amateur Cup run in 1956–57. He had trials at both Portsmouth and Arsenal (for whom he scored twice in a trial match) but Winchester's manager was former Saints player Harry Osman who alerted Ted Bates to Paine's potential and in August 1956, the Football Echo reported "Terry Paine, a Winchester City forward, in whom Arsenal were interested has been added to the playing staff list."

Southampton
Paine signed amateur forms with Southampton in August 1956 and then in February 1957, Saints signed Paine as a full-timer when he appeared in a reserve game against Bristol Rovers. The following month he made his League debut at home to Brentford, just a week before his 18th birthday. Paine did not score in the 3–3 draw but the crowd were impressed by his ball-juggling skills, pace and ability to use either foot. Paine's rise to stardom was meteoric and, following just one outing in the Reserves, he was given his first team debut. A week later, on his birthday, he scored in a 1–1 draw against Aldershot. By the end of his first season he had become a virtual regular, switching from left wing to right wing and over the next 17 years hardly missed a game.

Oozing confidence, the young winger often ruffled a few feathers among his more senior colleagues but, to a man, they all recall being impressed by his undoubted ability, if not enchanted by his brashness. With maturity, Paine gained not only respect from his peers but international recognition when he played and scored in an England U23 match against Holland in March 1960.

Possessing superb ball-crossing skills, Paine could "land a ball on a sixpence" and Derek Reeves and George O'Brien were the first of many forwards to capitalise on the expertise of the canny winger, when Saints were Third Division champions in 1959–60.

Paine was the regular replacement when a goalkeeper became injured (this was before substitutes were allowed). In the first match of the 1961–62 season, at home to Plymouth Argyle on 19 August, Ron Reynolds broke his ankle. Paine replaced him in goal but let in 2 goals so he in turn was replaced by Cliff Huxford; unfortunately Paine was unable to create the equalising goal and Saints lost 2–1.

As Saints' fortunes prospered so did Paine's and, after being made team captain in August 1961, he won the first of 19 full England caps in May 1963.

Over the next few seasons Paine, with help from fellow-winger John Sydenham, provided the pinpoint crosses on which forwards such as Ron Davies and Martin Chivers were to thrive. Gradually, with the almost total demise of wingers, Paine took his passing proficiencies into midfield and his dextrous distribution was partially instrumental in the launching of Mick Channon's rise to prominence. Steering clear of serious injury in a remarkable way, Paine was often guilty of committing petty fouls and any games missed were usually the result of suspensions arising from such indiscretions.

In his Southampton career he made 713 league appearances, scoring 160 goals, plus a further 102 cup and other appearances, with another 27 goals. This places him third on the club's list of all-time goalscorers. He was an "ever-present" for a record number of 7 seasons.

An era ended when Bates retired from management in 1973 and Paine moved to Hereford United in the summer of 1974 to make a further 106 appearances thus establishing an all-time league record of 819 appearances. Tony Ford and goalkeeper Peter Shilton have since passed that figure, but the achievement contributed to Paine being awarded the MBE for his services to football and when he retired, he moved into management with non-league Cheltenham Town.

He has been honoured by having one of the hospitality suites at the St Mary's Stadium named after him.

Off the pitch, Paine had cultivated various business interests while at The Dell and was a Conservative Councillor for Bargate on Southampton Borough Council for three years.

Hereford United
In July 1974, Paine became player-coach at Hereford United where, alongside manager John Sillett, and serving prolific scorer Dixie McNeil, he helped United romp away with the Division Three championship.

International career
Paine was recognised at England Under-23 level and scored in an England Under-23 match against Holland in March 1960. After 4 games with the Under-23, in 1963 he won his first full cap and later that year he scored a hat trick at Wembley against Northern Ireland to become the first outside-right to score three goals for England since Stanley Matthews in 1937. Furthermore, no forward wearing the no. 7 shirt had ever scored a hat-trick at Wembley.

Paine featured in England manager Alf Ramsey's plans and he was one of the 22-man squad for the 1966 World Cup. He played in only one match, against Mexico, and was injured in his 19th and, as it turned out, his last international. Ramsey, of course, had now found little use for "old-fashioned" wingers. Paine was one of four England players to play for England in the tournament without playing in the final itself, the others being Jimmy Greaves, John Connelly and Ian Callaghan.

In the 1966 World Cup final only the 11 players on the pitch at the end of the 4–2 win over West Germany received medals. Following a Football Association led campaign to persuade FIFA to award medals to all the winners' squad members, Paine was presented with his medal by Gordon Brown at a ceremony at 10 Downing Street on 10 June 2009.

Management career
Upon retirement, Paine decided to remain in football concentrating on coaching, including a spell as manager of non-league Cheltenham Town, combining his role at Cheltenham with running a pub in Cheltenham town centre called the Prince of Wales on Portland Street. Much of the 1980s were spent in Johannesburg where he went on to coach Wits University Football Club, but in 1988 he returned to England to work at Coventry City with John Sillett, previously his manager at Hereford.

Paine previously worked as a football presenter on digital satellite TV sports channel SuperSport in South Africa. He often appeared alongside former Manchester United goalkeeper Gary Bailey, on English Premiership and UEFA Champions League matches.

During the run up to South Africa's successful 2010 World Cup bid, Paine was a "Bid Ambassador" and was part of the delegation in Zurich when South Africa's victory in the bidding was announced.

On 1 January 2013 Paine took up the appointment of Honorary President of Southampton FC. Included is a remit to act as a club ambassador, both home and abroad.

Career statistics

Honours
Southampton
Third Division: 1959–60

Hereford United
Third Division: 1975–76
Welsh Cup: 1975–76

England
FIFA World Cup: 1966

References

External links
 
 

1939 births
Living people
Sportspeople from Winchester
English footballers
English football managers
Winchester City F.C. players
Southampton F.C. players
Hereford United F.C. players
Cheltenham Town F.C. players
English expatriates in South Africa
Cheltenham Town F.C. managers
England international footballers
England under-23 international footballers
1966 FIFA World Cup players
FIFA World Cup-winning players
Members of the Order of the British Empire
English Football League players
English Football League representative players
Association football wingers
Footballers from Hampshire